Singleton may refer to:

Sciences, technology

Mathematics
 Singleton (mathematics), a set with exactly one element
 Singleton field, used in conformal field theory

Computing 
 Singleton pattern, a design pattern that allows only one instance of a class to exist
 Singleton bound, used in coding theory
 Singleton variable, a variable that is referenced only once
 Singleton, a character encoded with one unit in variable-width encoding schemes for computer character sets
 Singleton, an empty tag or self-closing tag in XHTML or XML coding

Social science
 Singleton (global governance), a hypothetical world order with a single decision-making agency
 Singleton, a consonant that is not a geminate in linguistics
 Singleton, a person that is not a twin or other multiple birth

People
 Singleton (surname), for a partial list of people with the surname "Singleton"

Places

United Kingdom
 Singleton, Lancashire, England
 Singleton, West Sussex, England
 Singleton, Kent, England
 Singleton Park, Swansea, Wales
 Singleton Abbey
 Singleton Hospital

Australia
 Singleton, New South Wales
 Singleton Council, New South Wales
 Singleton, Western Australia

Other uses
 Singleton (lifestyle), a self-description of individuals without romantic partners, particularly applied to women in their thirties introduced in the novel and film Bridget Jones's Diary
 The Singleton (film), a 2015 British drama film
 "Singleton", a short story by Greg Egan
 Singleton (cards), a single card in a suit
 The Singleton, a whisky made by Diageo
 Catawba (grape) or Singleton